Bocageopsis is a genus of flowering plants belonging to the family Annonaceae.

Its native range is Southern Tropical America.

Species:

Bocageopsis canescens 
Bocageopsis mattogrossensis 
Bocageopsis multiflora 
Bocageopsis pleiosperma

References

Annonaceae
Annonaceae genera